Podkraj is a settlement in the Municipality of Hrastnik in central Slovenia. It lies on the right bank of the Sava River. The area is part of the traditional region of Lower Carniola. It is now included with the rest of the municipality in the Central Sava Statistical Region. It includes the hamlets of Sava, Koritnik, Strušce, Kladje, Ruda, Boriče, and Hribar.

Church
The local church is dedicated to Saint Nicholas. It dates to the late 15th or early 16th century.

Mass graves
Podkraj is the site of three known mass graves from the period immediately after the Second World War. It contains the remains of an unknown number of German soldiers that were murdered here in May 1945. It contains the remains of an unknown number of German soldiers that were murdered here in May 1945. The Gas Station Mass Grave is located near the gas station west of Podkraj on the right bank of the Sava. It contains the remains of civilian refugees that were fleeing towards Austria at the end of the war, but were intercepted by the Yugoslav Army at Hrastnik and murdered.

References

External links

Podkraj on Geopedia

Populated places in the Municipality of Hrastnik